The Beat Cop's Guide to Chicago Eats! is a 2010 paperback food guide by Sgt. David Joseph Haynes and Christopher "Bull" Garlington, published by Lake Claremont Press. The book examines popular Chicago cafes and restaurants frequented by Chicago Police officers.

References

Further reading
 
 
 

Cuisine of Chicago
Restaurant guides
2010 non-fiction books